Gounaris is a Greek surname. Notable people with the surname include:

Dimitrios Gounaris (1867–1922), Greek politician and Prime Minister of Greece
Ioannis Gounaris (born 1952), Greek footballer
Nikos Gounaris (1915–1965), Greek singer

Greek-language surnames
Surnames